is a Japanese tarento, singer, producer and actress. She is best known as a former member of idol groups HKT48, AKB48 and STU48, and was the theater manager for HKT48 and STU48.

Career

2007–2012: AKB48
In October 2007, she auditioned and was chosen as a trainee for the 5th generation of AKB48. She was promoted to a regular member of Team B in August 2008. Her first title track single was "Ōgoe Diamond", in October of that year. She placed 27th in the popularity-driven 2009 General Election, where she was grouped with the "Under Girls", the ones who would perform on the first B-side singles. She remained in that position on the follow-up single releases until the following year, the 2010 General Election, where she placed 19th and was grouped with the main girls who sing on the title track. In August 2009, AKB48 announced that she would transfer to Team A, although the transfer did not occur until July 2010.

On December 4, 2010, Sashihara attempted to upload 100 articles in a day on her official blog, with the number of page views reaching 35 million on the same day.

In January 2011, Sashihara starred in a half-hour television program titled , broadcast by TBS, which features her  character.  The program was subtitled .

Sashihara starred as the lead character in the NTV4 drama "Muse no Kagami" starting on January 14, 2012. She sings the theme song titled "Soredemo Suki Da yo", which was released as her debut solo single on May 2, on the major record label Avex Trax.

In April 2012, it was announced that Sashihara would produce Yubi Matsuri, an idol festival to be held at Nippon Budokan on June 25, featuring girl groups such as Momoiro Clover Z, Idoling!!!, Shiritsu Ebisu Chugaku, Super Girls, Tokyo Girls' Style, Passpo and Watarirouka Hashiritai 7.

2012–2017: Transition to HKT48
On June 16, 2012, Sashihara was demoted and transferred to HKT48, due to her involvement in a dating/sex scandal: the tabloid Shukan Bunshun published an interview with a man who allegedly dated and slept with Sashihara. She replied by saying that the man was "just a friend", and the story was completely false. On June 20, 2012, Sashihara had a panic attack onstage, and hyperventilated due to the stress. Sashihara debuted at the HKT48 Theater as a member of HKT48 Team H on July 5, 2012.

Sashihara released her second single, "Ikujinashi Masquerade", on October 17, 2012. The single reached number one on the Oricon Weekly chart, only the third solo single by an AKB48 member ever to do so.

In 2013 she assumed the position of HKT48 co-manager and theater manager, while continuing to be a member of HKT48 Team H. Sashihara's promotion was also seen by some as a confirmation of Yasushi Akimoto's wish to grant her a role in the management of the group because of her production skills, something he's been hinting at since as early as 2010.

In 2013 she would produce SKE48 member Kaori Matsumura's first solo single "Matsumurabu". Sashihara was given free reins over costume design, lyrics writing, PV direction, as well as choice of music and instrumental arrangement.

Sashihara received the most votes in AKB48's annual general election in 2013: with 150,570 votes she beat out Yuko Oshima, who received 136,503 votes.

In the wake of her mainstream popularity, on August 11, 2014, Sashihara's first autobiography, "Gyakuten-ryoku ~ Pinchi o Mate ~", was published by Koudansha, selling over 20,000 copies in its first week of release and prompting a number of subsequent reprints. The book was based on a series of interviews with Sashihara, and recollects various periods of her life and career. The book was widely advertised by press as a self-improvement volume, whose reading was recommended to salarymen and OL, as well.

In 2015, Sashihara won AKB48's general election with a total of 194,049 votes, returning to the center position. In 2016, Sashihara won AKB48's general election with a total of 243,011 votes. In 2017,  Sashihara won AKB48's general election with a total of 246,376 votes.

In 2017, she started the audition for voice actress idol competition on April 29. In the same year, she started producing Japanese idol group =LOVE (Equal Love). and that same year became member and theater manager of the newly founded STU48. She resigned from STU48 on November 25 to focus on HKT48.

2017–present
On December 15, 2018, she announced her graduation from HKT48. Her concert was then held on April 28th, 2019 titled "Sashihara Rino Graduation Concert ~Sayonara, Sashihara Rino~". On February 12, 2019, she announced her second idol group ≠ME (Not Equal Me), a sister group to =LOVE.

AKB48 General Election placements

Sashihara's placements in AKB48's annual general election:

Discography

Solo singles

* RIAJ Digital Track Chart was established in April 2009 and discontinued in July 2012.

Singles with HKT48

Singles with AKB48

Albums with AKB48
 Kamikyokutachi
 "Kimi to Niji to Taiyō to"
 Koko ni Ita Koto
 "Shōjotachi yo"
 "Overtake"
 "Kaze no Yukue"
 "Koko ni Ita Koto"
 1830m
 "First Rabbit"
 "Ren'ai Sōsenkyo"
 "Abogado Ja nē Shi..."
 "Itterasshai"
 "Aozora yo Sabishikunai Ka?"
 Tsugi no Ashiato
 "After Rain"
 "Boy Hunt no Houhou Oshiemasu"
 Koko ga Rhodes da, Koko de Tobe!
 "Setsunai Reply"
 "Ai no Sonzai"
 0 to 1 no Aida
 "Yasashiku Aritai"

Performance groups
 Team B 3rd Stage 
  (after Ayaka Kikuchi's graduation)
 Team K 4th Stage 
 Team A 4th Stage 
 "Faint"
 Kenkyūsei 
 "Faint"
 Team B 4th Stage 
 
 Team Kenkyūsei 
 
 
 Theatre G-Posso 
 "Confession"
 Team A 6th Stage 
 
 
 Team H 1st Stage 
 "Glory Days"
 
 Team H Waiting Stage 
 
 
 Himawari-gumi 
 
 Team H 2nd Stage  
 
 
 Team H 3rd Stage

Appearances

Music videos

Films 
 Muse no Kagami (2012), Maki Mukouda
 Kodomo Keisatsu (2013), Rino Makihara
 I'll Give It My All... Tomorrow (2013), Aya Unami
 Barairo no Būko (2014), Sachiko (Būko)
 Crayon Shin-Chan: My Moving Story! Cactus Large Attack! (2015), Sumaho-chan (voice)
 One Piece: Stampede (2019), Anne (voice)
 Goodbye, Don Glees! (2022), Mako Kamogawa (voice)

Dubbing 
 Hop (2011), Pink Berets

TV dramas
 Majisuka Gakuen (TV Tokyo, 2010), Wota
 Dr.Irabu Ichirō (TV Asahi, 2011), herself
 Majisuka Gakuen 2 (TV Tokyo, 2011), Wota
 Muse no Kagami (NTV, 2012), Maki Mukouda
 Fukuoka Renai Hakusho (KBC, 2012), Kaori
 Kodomo Keisatsu Episode 6 (MBS, 2012), Rino Makihara
 Megutantte Mahō Tsukaeru no? Episode 6 (NTV, 2012), Maki Mukouda
 Yūsha Yoshihiko to Akuryō no Kagi Episode 9 (TV Tokyo, 2012), Eliza
 Honto ni Atta Kowai Hanashi Natsu no Tokubetsuhen 2013 "Ugomeku Ningyō" (Fuji TV, 2013), Rina Sonoda
 Tenmasan ga Yuku Episode 5 (TBS, 2013), Miyoko Oshimizu
 Majisuka Gakuen 4 Episode 1 (TV Tokyo, 2015), Scandal
 Koinaka Episode 9 (Fuji TV, 2015)
 Majisuka Gakuen 0: Kisarazu Rantōhen Episode 1 (Nippon Television, 2015), Ageman
 AKB Horror Night: Adrenaline's Night Ep.31 – Another Meeting Person (TV Asashi, 2016), Sayaka
 AKB Love Night: Love Factory Ep.19 – Italian String (TV Asashi, 2016),  Akiko

Bibliography
 Gyakutenryoku: Pinch o Mate (Power of reversal:wait a crisis) (Kodansha, August 11, 2014)

Photobooks
 B.L.T. U-17 vol.8 (Tokyo News Service, November 6, 2008) 
 B.L.T. U-17 vol.11 sizzleful girl 2009 summer (Tokyo News Service, August 5, 2009) 
 Sashiko (Kodansha, January 19, 2012) 
 Neko ni Maketa (Kobunsha, December 26, 2013) 
 Scandal Chūdoku (Kodansha, March 22, 2016)

References

External links
  
 

1992 births
Living people
Actors from Ōita Prefecture

Japanese idols
Japanese women pop singers
Japanese television personalities
Avex Group artists
Musicians from Ōita Prefecture
HKT48 members
AKB48 members
STU48 members
21st-century Japanese women singers
21st-century Japanese singers
21st-century Japanese actresses